Lake Robe Game Reserve is a protected area located about  south of the town of Robe in South Australia. It covers the saline lake, Lake Robe, and some surrounding land and also immediately adjoins the northern boundary of the Little Dip Conservation Park. It was proclaimed on 4 November 1993 to protect "valuable habitats for a variety of waterbirds, and terrestrial mammals notably the hooded plover (Thinomis rubricollis), sharp-tailed sandpiper (Calidris acuminata), and the swamp rat (Rattus lutreolus)" and to manage recreational duck hunting activity. The area is classified as an IUCN Category VI protected area.

See also
Duck hunting in South Australia 
Lake Hawdon System Important Bird Area

References

External links
Lake Robe Game Reserve webpage on protected planet	

Game reserves of South Australia
Protected areas established in 1993
1993 establishments in Australia
Limestone Coast